The Turks and Caicos Islands records in swimming are the fastest ever performances of swimmers from the Turks and Caicos Islands, which are recognised and ratified by the Turks and Caicos Islands Swim Federation.

All records were set in finals unless noted otherwise.

Long Course (50 m)

Men

Women

Short Course (25 m)

Men

Women

Mixed relay

References

External links
Turks and Caicos Islands Swim Federation

Turks and Caicos Islands